St. Paul's Chapel usually refers to a church in New York City built in the 18th century.

St. Paul's Chapel or Chapel of St Paul may also refer to:
Chapel of Saint Paul, Damascus, Syria
 St. Paul's Chapel (Columbia University), United States, built in the early 20th century
 St. Paul's Chapel (Crownsville, Maryland), United States, listed on the National Register of Historic Places
St. Paul's Chapel (Staatsburg, New York), United States, Roman Catholic parish church 
St. Paul's Chapel (Lake Oscawana, New York), United States, Roman Catholic parish church
Sourp Boghos chapel, Nicosia, Cyprus, Armenian Apostolic chapel

See also
St. Paul's Church (disambiguation)